So So Def Recordings is an American  record label based in Atlanta, Georgia, United States, and owned by producer Jermaine Dupri, specializing in Southern hip hop, R&B and bass music. So So Def has managed artists such as Bow Wow, Kris Kross, TLC, and Usher.

Beginnings
So So Def was established in 1993 as a spin-off of Dupri's production company of the same moniker, through a joint venture with Sony and Columbia. Its first act was Xscape, whose debut album was released in the fall of the same year and went Platinum—as did their 2nd and 3rd albums, released in 1995 and 1998.   In 1994, the label released the debut album of Da Brat, who became the 1st solo female emcee to be certified for Platinum album sales. In 1996, Kandi Burruss brought Jagged Edge to the attention of the label; their debut album, A Jagged Era, was released in 1997.  So So Def later released the Triple Platinum debut album by Lil’ Bow Wow in 2000. Other acts on the label have included: Dem Franchise Boyz, Maestro Harrell, The Ghost Town DJs, INOJ, J-Kwon, Trina Broussard, 3LW, and Anthony Hamilton.

Distribution 

In late 2002, So So Def's distribution deal with Columbia ended.  The following year, Dupri moved So So Def to Arista.  While many of So So Def's acts moved with the label to Arista, Bow Wow and Jagged Edge were forced to remain at Columbia, due to their contracts having been with that company primarily. In 2004, per the re-consolidation of labels caused by the merger of its former Sony parent and BMG, So So Def was shifted from Arista to Zomba.

In 2005, Dupri was appointed Executive Vice President of Urban Music at Virgin, causing So So Def to move again, this time over to Virgin and EMI—resulting in the loss of Bone Crusher and YoungBloodZ.  So So Def, meanwhile, was able to retain J-Kwon and Anthony Hamilton, despite them still being signed to Zomba.  In 2006, Dupri had a falling out with Virgin, resulting in him leaving his post at the company.  Intermittent, he was appointed President of urban music at Universal's Island, resulting in So So Def once again making a move to UMG's The Island Def Jam.

In 2009, it was reported that Dupri had been terminated from his post at Island.  Later in the same year, it was rumored that So So Def had moved back to Sony, where it reportedly operated under Zomba once more. In 2010, Mississippi-based independent label Malaco Records distributed So So Def's release of the Why Did I Get Married Too? soundtrack.

In 2014, So So Def partnered with Primary Wave for the release of Jagged Edge's album J.E. Heartbreak 2. In June 2016, So So Def partnered with Epic for current distribution.

Discography

Former artists
Kris Kross
Trina Broussard
Xscape
Monica (Management only)
Bow Wow
Playa Poncho
Fundisha
Whodini
Dem Franchize Boyz
Harlem World
Ghost Town DJ's
Tigah
The R.O.C.
TLC (Management only)
T. Waters
YoungBloodZ
Bone Crusher
Anthony Hamilton
Daz Dillinger
3LW
Miss B
Brooks Buford
Rocko
DJ Felli Fel
Young Capone
Hot Dollar
Johntá Austin
T. Waters
Dondria
9th Ward
Leah Labelle (deceased)

References

External links
 Official site

American record labels
Contemporary R&B record labels
Hip hop record labels
Record labels established in 1993
Zomba Group of Companies subsidiaries